Khvorjan (also Romanized as Khvorjān and Khowrjān; also known as Khāneh Khurgān, Khāneh-ye Khūrqān, and Khowrgūn) is a village in Shahidabad Rural District, Mashhad-e Morghab District, Khorrambid County, Fars Province, Iran. At the 2006 census, its population was 208, in 58 families.

References 

Populated places in Khorrambid County